Charles Davies may refer to:

 Charles Davies (athlete), British athlete
 Charles Davies (Tasmanian politician) (1847–1921), member of the Tasmanian Legislative Council
 Charles Davies (South Australian politician) (1813–1888), member of the South Australian Legislative Council
 Charles Lynn Davies (born 1929), Welsh rugby union player
 Charles Maurice Davies (1828–1910), Anglican clergyman, author and spiritualist
 Charles Davies (professor) (1798–1876), American mathematics professor at United States Military Academy
 Charles Davies (Baptist minister) (1849–1927), Welsh Baptist minister
 Charlie Davies (born 1986), American soccer player
 Charlie Davies (rugby union) (born 1990), English rugby union scrum half 
 Chick Davies (basketball) (1900–1985, Charles Robinson Davies), American college basketball coach

See also

 Charles Thomas-Davies
 
 Charles Davis (disambiguation)